In enzymology, a glutamine-fructose-6-phosphate transaminase (isomerizing) is an enzyme that catalyzes the chemical reaction

L-glutamine + D-fructose 6-phosphate  L-glutamate + D-glucosamine 6-phosphate

Thus, the two substrates of this enzyme are L-glutamine and D-fructose 6-phosphate, whereas its two products are L-glutamate and D-glucosamine 6-phosphate.

This enzyme belongs to the family of transferases, specifically the transaminases, which transfer nitrogenous groups.  The systematic name of this enzyme class is L-glutamine:D-fructose-6-phosphate isomerase (deaminating). This enzyme participates in glutamate metabolism and aminosugars metabolism.

Structural studies

References

 
 
 
 

EC 2.6.1
Enzymes of known structure